Norkama is a town in the Ouo Department of Comoé Province in south-western Burkina Faso. The town has a population of 1,000.

References

Populated places in the Cascades Region
Comoé Province